Angela P. Harris (born 1961) is an American legal scholar at UC Davis School of Law, in the fields of critical race theory, feminist legal scholarship, and criminal law.  She held the position of professor of law at UC Berkeley School of Law, joining the faculty in 1988. In 2009, Harris joined the faculty of the State University of New York at Buffalo Law School as a visiting professor. In 2010, she also assumed the role of acting vice dean for research and faculty development. In 2011, she accepted an offer to join the faculty at the UC Davis School of Law, and began teaching as a professor of law in the 2011–12 academic year.

Biography
Harris earned a BA from the University of Michigan in 1981, and her MA (1983) and JD (1986) from the University of Chicago. She clerked for Judge Joel Flaum of the United States Court of Appeals for the Seventh Circuit, and worked as an attorney for the law firm of Morrison and Foerster. She was tenured at Berkeley in 1992.

Recognition
Harris has won the Rutter Award for Teaching Distinction (2003; established 1995), and the 2003 Matthew O. Tobriner Public Service Award, a San Francisco Bay Area award, for commitment to academic diversity and legal mentoring. In 2008, Harris won the Clyde Ferguson Award from the Association of American Law Schools Minority Section. Alongside Kimberlé Crenshaw, Harris has been recognized as one of the leading scholars of critical race theory.

Selected bibliography

Books

Chapters in books

Journal articles

References 

1961 births
African-American academics
American legal scholars
American women lawyers
Feminist studies scholars
Living people
UC Berkeley School of Law faculty

University of Chicago Law School alumni
University of Michigan alumni
Place of birth missing (living people)
UC Davis School of Law faculty
American women legal scholars
American women academics
21st-century African-American people
21st-century African-American women
20th-century African-American people
20th-century African-American women
People associated with Morrison & Foerster